StarNews is an American, English language daily newspaper for Wilmington, North Carolina, and its surrounding area (known as the Lower Cape Fear). It is North Carolina's oldest newspaper in continuous publication. It was owned by Halifax Media Group until 2015, when Halifax was acquired by New Media Investment Group.

The Star-News covers a three-county region in Southeastern North Carolina: New Hanover, Brunswick and Pender.

History

The paper was originally published on September 23, 1867, as the Wilmington Evening Star by former Confederate Major William H. Bernard. Shortly after first publishing the paper, Bernard changed the paper to come out in the morning and changed the paper name to the Wilmington Morning Star. "[I]t was an ardent advocacy of white supremacy-a view never more strongly demonstrated than in its coverage of the Wilmington race riots of 1898."

In 1927, R. W. Page bought the Morning Star, and in 1929 bought the city's afternoon newspaper, the Wilmington News-Dispatch, which was later shortened to simply the Wilmington News. Later in 1929, the two papers began running a combined edition on Sunday, the Star-News. Page and his family continued to own the paper until 1975, when it was acquired by The New York Times Company.

From 1935 to 1970, the Morning Star was located in the Murchison Building on North Front Street in downtown Wilmington. The newspaper moved into its current location at 1003 17th Street South in 1970.

On April 24, 2003; separate delivery of the Morning Star and News ended, and the two papers merged into a single seven-day paper, the StarNews.

As a result of damage from Hurricane Florence in September 2018, the StarNews moved into a temporary location in the Harrelson Building, after operating from a Hampton Inn, WWAY, and even homes of staff. The StarNews never stopped publishing during the storm.

See also
 List of newspapers in North Carolina

References

External links 
 
 Archive of previous issues of Star-News on Google News

Wilmington, North Carolina
New Hanover County, North Carolina
Cape Fear (region)
Daily newspapers published in the United States
Gannett publications
Daily newspapers published in North Carolina
Publications established in 1867
1867 establishments in North Carolina